José Ribas (born 1 October 1899, date of death unknown) was an Argentine long-distance runner. He competed in the marathon at the 1932 Summer Olympics.

References

1899 births
Year of death missing
Athletes (track and field) at the 1932 Summer Olympics
Argentine male long-distance runners
Argentine male marathon runners
Olympic athletes of Argentina
Athletes from São Paulo